Mary Help of Christians School, Inc. - Canlubang is an educational sectarian institution situated beside Don Bosco College, Canlubang in Calamba, Laguna, in the Philippines.

The school is administered by the Daughters of Mary Help of Christian (Italian:Figlie di Maria Ausiliatrice or FMA), also known as Salesian Sisters of Don Bosco (FMA).

References

Schools in Calamba, Laguna
1973 establishments in the Philippines
Educational institutions established in 1973